The 2004 NCAA Men's Water Polo Championship was the 36th annual NCAA Men's Water Polo Championship to determine the national champion of NCAA men's collegiate water polo. Tournament matches were played at the Avery Aquatic Center in Stanford, California during December 2004.

UCLA defeated Stanford in the final, 10–9 (in overtime), to win their eighth national title. The Bruins (25–3) were coached by Adam Krikorian.

The Most Outstanding Player of the tournament was Brett Ormsby from UCLA. For the first time, two All-Tournament Teams were named: a First Team (with eight players) and a Second Team (with seven players).

The tournament's leading scorer, with 7 goals, was Endre Rex-Kiss from Loyola Marymount.

Qualification
Since there has only ever been one single national championship for water polo, all NCAA men's water polo programs (whether from Division I, Division II, or Division III) were eligible. A total of 4 teams were invited to contest this championship.

Bracket
Site: Avery Aquatic Center, Stanford, California

All-tournament teams

First Team 
Brett Ormsby, UCLA (Most outstanding player)
Joe Axelrad, UCLA
Tony Azevedo, Stanford
Greg Crum, Stanford
Albert Garcia, UCLA
Thomas Hopkins, Stanford
Endre Rex-Kiss, Loyola Marymount
Peter Varellas, Stanford

Second Team 
 Josh Hewko, UCLA
 Michael March, UCLA
 Brian McShane, Loyola Marymount
 Jamal Motlagh, Princeton
 Ted Peck, UCLA
 Peter Sabbatini, Princeton
 John Stover, Princeton

See also 
 NCAA Men's Water Polo Championship
 NCAA Women's Water Polo Championship

References

NCAA Men's Water Polo Championship
NCAA Men's Water Polo Championship
2004 in sports in California
December 2004 sports events in the United States
2004